Paweł Hajduczek (born November 12, 1982 in Poland) is a Polish football midfielder.

References

External links 
 
 Profile on Official Tavriya website 
 
 Tavria statistics

Polish footballers
Poland youth international footballers
Polish expatriate footballers
Expatriate footballers in Ukraine
Expatriate footballers in Greece
Expatriate footballers in Kazakhstan
Expatriate footballers in Georgia (country)
ŁKS Łódź players
SC Tavriya Simferopol players
Polonia Warsaw players
Olympiacos Volos F.C. players
FC Metalurh Zaporizhzhia players
FC Sioni Bolnisi players
Ekstraklasa players
Ukrainian Premier League players
Erovnuli Liga players
1982 births
Living people
People from Jastrzębie-Zdrój
Sportspeople from Silesian Voivodeship
Polish expatriate sportspeople in Ukraine
Polish expatriate sportspeople in Greece
Association football defenders